Thanh Hóa is a province in the North Central Coast region of Vietnam. This is a relatively large province, which ranks as fifth in area and as third in population among 63 central administrative subdivisions. Its capital and largest city is Thanh Hóa City. The province is widely called Xứ Thanh (The Land of Thanh).

Human civilization has existed in Thanh Hóa for about 6,000 years ago, as one of the earliest centers of the ancient Vietnamese. Archaeological excavations have revealed that the first culture presented was the Đa Bút Culture, a culture located along the Sông Đáy river and the Sông Mã river.

Thanh Hóa is located in the middle of North Vietnam and North Central Coast as a transition in many aspects: geology, climate, administrative division and local culture. Thus, these factors show that Xứ Thanh is a province with many particular local habits and customs and cultures.
  
Thanh Hóa has two provincial cities, one district-level town and 24 rural districts with an area of 11,133.4 km2 and a population of approximate 3.6 million. Sầm Sơn city is a famous seaside resort situated 16   km from the Thanh Hóa city centre. Whilst, Bỉm Sơn township is a large industrial centre, especially cement. Nghi Sơn is a promising Economic zone, expected to be central of Thanh Hoa's Industrial with large Refinery Factory, Deepwater Seaport and many projects in progress. The province is also home of many ethnic groups, in which the most seven ethnicities are Kinh, Mường, Thái, H'Mông, Dao, Thổ, Khơ-mú with mentions of the legend Long Quân. ("Dragon Lord of Lac")

Geography

Geographic position 
The coordinate was accurately measured as 19°18'N - 20°40'N (from the southernmost point to northernmost point), 104°22'E - 106°05'E (from the westernmost point to easternmost point). It borders the following provinces: Sơn La, Hòa Bình, Ninh Bình, Nghệ An, it also neighbors Houaphanh province for 192 km boundary line furthermore.

Administrative divisions
Thanh Hóa is subdivided into 27 district-level sub-divisions:

 23 rural districts:

 Bá Thước
 Cẩm Thủy
 Đông Sơn
 Hà Trung
 Hậu Lộc
 Hoằng Hóa
 Lang Chánh
 Mường Lát
 Nga Sơn
 Ngọc Lặc
 Như Thanh
 Như Xuân
 Nông Cống
 Quan Hóa
 Quan Sơn
 Quảng Xương
 Thạch Thành
 Thiệu Hóa
 Thọ Xuân
 Thường Xuân
 Triệu Sơn
 Vĩnh Lộc 
 Yên Định

 2 district-level towns:

 Bỉm Sơn
 Nghi Sơn

 2 provincial cities:
 Thanh Hóa (capital)
 Sầm Sơn
They are further subdivided into 28 commune-level towns (or townlets), 579 communes, and 30 wards.

Etymology
The province's name derives from Sino-Vietnamese 清化.

清 "Thanh" meaning clear; pure; fine. 化 "Hóa" meaning “to transform; to change into; to become”.

External links
Official Site of Thanh Hóa Government
Official Site of Thanh Hóa City Government

References

 
North Central Coast
Gulf of Tonkin
Provinces of Vietnam